Ameletidae, the combmouthed minnow mayflies, is a family of mayfly.

References

insect families